QBU or QBUS may refer to:

 QBU-191, a Chinese designated marksman rifle
 QBU-10, a Chinese anti-materiel sniper rifle
 QBU-88, a Chinese designated marksman rifle
 QBU, a nickname for the University of Miami Hurricanes football program
 Q-Bus, a technology used with PDP and MicroVAX computer systems
 QBUS Cambuslans, a BT site engineering code
 Qualified business unit, an accounting concept